Gracie Jiu-Jitsu is a self-defence martial arts system instructional book written by Helio Gracie. Its first edition was published in 2006 by Editora Saraiva.

Summary 
The book describes Brazilian jiu-jitsu (BJJ) techniques. The back cover says: "Helio Gracie, creator of the Gracie Jiu-jitsu, had a weak health in adolescence, being forbidden to perform any physical activity, until the chance put him on the tatami. His fascinants results, inside and out the ring, thrilled all a nation and made him the first hero of Brazilian sport. After dedicating all of his life to this style of fight, Helio presents his first and unique book about the art that has made him a triumphant man. Born in 1913, now he lives in Itaipava, in Rio, and teaches the jiu-jitsu".

Style 
The book discusses the notion that BJJ is one of the most effective martial arts. This claim would be later be proved correct by the success of the style in the UFC championship and later in MMA.

Chapters 
 1 – Defenses in position stand up, against attacks by front
 2 – Defenses in position stand up, against attacks by back
 3 – Defenses against guns
 4 – Mount
 5 – Guard
 6 – Side mount (100k) Note: Side mount is the traditional name given to the position nowadays called in Brazil 100K.
 7 – Back mount
 Appendix – the Gracie diet

References 

Brazilian jiu-jitsu
Gracie family